Victory Brinker (born February 25, 2012) is an American singer, actor and performer specializing in opera and live covers of arias. She performed on season 16 of America's Got Talent.

Biography 
Victory was adopted by the Brinker family, was an early talker, and memorized albums and got into opera music at age of 4. She went to church and memorized hymns. Her mother, Christine, homeschooled and trained her at singing. Her father is a pastor at Impact Life Church in Greensburg.

She started her opera career by performing at sporting events across the country after winning 12 talent shows.

She made her opera debut at the Westmoreland Art Nationals exhibitions in 2019. She then competed on season 16 of America's Got Talent when she was 9, and made it to the finals with the “golden buzzer”.

In 2022, she set the Guinness World Record for the worlds youngest opera singer. Later that year around Christmas, she performed all over New York City, and The Palace with Latshaw Pops. She released a Christmas EP titled The Wonder of Christmas despite being eliminated from America's Got Talent.

Discography 
 The Wonder of Christmas (2021, EP)

References 

21st-century American women singers
Living people
Opera crossover singers
Singers from Pennsylvania
2012 births